Kormesiy Peak is a rocky peak rising to 235 m in the southeast extremity of Breznik Heights on Greenwich Island in the South Shetland Islands, Antarctica.  Situated on the southeast coast of the island, 2.17 km west of Fort Point, 800 m southwest of St. Kiprian Peak, 730 m southeast of Drangov Peak, and 430 m east of Ziezi Peak.  Bulgarian topographic survey Tangra 2004/05 and mapping in 2009.  Named after Khan Kormesiy of Bulgaria, 721-738 AD.

Maps
 L.L. Ivanov et al. Antarctica: Livingston Island and Greenwich Island, South Shetland Islands. Scale 1:100000 topographic map. Sofia: Antarctic Place-names Commission of Bulgaria, 2005.
 L.L. Ivanov. Antarctica: Livingston Island and Greenwich, Robert, Snow and Smith Islands. Scale 1:120000 topographic map.  Troyan: Manfred Wörner Foundation, 2009.

References
 Kormesiy Peak. SCAR Composite Gazetteer of Antarctica
 Bulgarian Antarctic Gazetteer. Antarctic Place-names Commission. (details in Bulgarian, basic data in English)

External links
 Kormesiy Peak. Copernix satellite image

Mountains of Greenwich Island
Bulgaria and the Antarctic